The Sun style (孙氏) t'ai chi ch'uan is well known for its smooth, flowing movements which omit the more physically vigorous crouching, leaping and fa jin of some other styles.  Its gentle postures and high stances make it very suitable for martial arts therapy.

History
Sun style t'ai chi ch'uan was developed by Sun Lutang, who is considered expert in two other internal martial arts styles: xingyiquan and baguazhang before he came to study t'ai chi ch'uan. Today, Sun-style ranks fourth in popularity and fifth in terms of seniority among the five family styles of t'ai chi ch'uan. He was also considered an accomplished Neo-Confucian and Taoist scholar, especially in the Yi Jing and the T'ai chi classics. Sun learned Wu (Hao)-style t'ai chi ch'uan from Hao Weizhen, who was Li Yiyu's (李亦畬) chief disciple. Sun style t'ai chi ch'uan is considered to be part of the umbrella of Sun style internal martial arts developed by Sun Lu T'ang.

Besides his earlier xingyi and bagua training, Sun's experiences with Hao Weizhen, Yang Shaohou, Yang Chengfu and Wu Jianquan influenced the development of what is today recognized as the Sun style of t'ai chi ch'uan.

The Sun style is a syncretic martial art, influenced by t'ai chi ch'uan, xingyiquan and baguazhang. One of the styles of t'ai chi ch'uan influencing the Sun style is Wu (Hao). The footwork of both styles are similar in that when one foot advances or retreats, the other foot follows. The Sun style also exhibits small circular movements with the hand.

Sun's son Sun Cunzhou (孫存周; 1893–1963) and daughter, Sun Jianyun (孫劍雲; 1914–2003) were t'ai chi ch'uan teachers, as well as Sun Cunzhou's daughter Sun Shurong (孫叔容; 1918–2005) who taught in Beijing until her death. Sun Wanrong (孫婉容; 1927—Present), who is the other daughter of Sun Cunzhou, still teaches t'ai chi ch'uan in Beijing.

References

Tai chi styles
Neijia